Horkelia marinensis is a rare species of flowering plant in the rose family known by the common name Point Reyes horkelia. It is endemic to the California coastline, where it is known from about Fort Bragg to near Santa Cruz. It grows on beaches and in other sandy coastal areas. This is a perennial herb growing in low, dense patches. The leaves are up to 10 centimeters long and are made up of toothed, hairy, gray-green leaflets each around a centimeter long. The foliage is glandular and strongly scented. The plant produces green to reddish-green stems up to 30 centimeters long which bear inflorescences of dense clustered flowers. Each flower has minute bractlets under reddish-green, fuzzy sepals. The petals are generally white and narrow with rounded ends. The center of the flower contains a ring of stamens around a patch of 20 to 30 pistils.

References

External links
Jepson Manual Treatment
Photo gallery

marinensis
Endemic flora of California